Siófok is a district in north-eastern part of Somogy County. Siófok is also the name of the town where the district seat is found. The district is located in the Southern Transdanubia Statistical Region.

Geography 
Siófok District borders with Balatonfüred District and Balatonalmádi District (Veszprém County) to the north, Enying District (Fejér County) to the east, Tamási District (Tolna County) to the southeast, Tab District to the south, Fonyód District to the west. The number of the inhabited places in Siófok District is 24.

Municipalities 
The district has 3 towns, 1 large village and 20 villages.
(ordered by population, as of 1 January 2013)

The bolded municipalities are cities, italics municipality is large village.

See also
List of cities and towns in Hungary

References

External links
 Postal codes of the Siófok District

Districts in Somogy County